LMQ may refer to:
 Marsa Brega Airport, the IATA code LMQ
 LMQ (esports), a League of Legends team
 ISO 639:lmq, the ISO 639 code for the Lamatuka language